Levan Eloshvili (born 21 October 1997) is a Georgian professional footballer who plays as a right winger for Grazer AK.

Club career
He made his Austrian Football First League debut for Kapfenberger SV on 26 May 2017 in a game against Floridsdorfer AC.

On 18 May 2022, Eloshvili signed a two-year contract with an option for an additional year with Grazer AK.

References

External links
 

1997 births
Living people
Footballers from Georgia (country)
Expatriate footballers from Georgia (country)
Expatriate footballers in Austria
Kapfenberger SV players
Grazer AK players
2. Liga (Austria) players
Georgia (country) under-21 international footballers
Association football midfielders